Live Sweet Basil Vol. 2 is a live album by jazz composer, arranger, conductor and pianist Gil Evans recorded by King Records (Japan) in New York in 1984 featuring Evans with his Monday Night Orchestra which included George Adams, Howard Johnson, and Lew Soloff and originally released in the US on the Gramavision label.

Reception
Allmusic awarded the album 2 stars, stating, " Although arranger/keyboardist Gil Evans is the leader of the 14-piece band, he has a very minor presence on the set, letting his talented sidemen get self-indulgent and take seemingly endless solos. Because the supporting cast includes such fine players... This is a lesser effort that should have been a memorable one".

Track listing
All compositions by Gil Evans except as indicated
 "Jelly Roll" - 11:15  
 "Friday the 13th" (Thelonious Monk) - 13:44  
 "Gone" – 16:00  
 "Prelude to Stone Free" - 8:42  
 "Stone Free" (Jimi Hendrix) - 14:00  
 "Snowflake Bop" (Anita Evans) - 16:58

Personnel
Gil Evans - piano, electric piano, arranger, conductor
Lew Soloff, Hannibal Marvin Peterson, Shunzo Ohno, Miles Evans - trumpet
George Adams - tenor saxophone
Chris Hunter - alto saxophone 
Howard Johnson - tuba, baritone saxophone, bass clarinet  
Tom Malone - trombone  
Hiram Bullock - guitar
Pete Levin - synthesizer  
Mark Egan - electric bass  
Adam Nussbaum - drums  
Mino Cinelu - percussion

References 

1987 live albums
Gil Evans live albums
Albums arranged by Gil Evans